Ebbe Gustaf Bring (4 July 1814 – 13 August 1884) was a Swedish bishop in the Church of Sweden and theologian.

Biography 
Bring was born in Askersund, Örebro County in 1814, to city physician and assessor Sven Håkan Bring and Ulrika (Ulla) Sofia Silfverswärd. He married Maria Ulrika (Ulla) Ehrenborg, sister of writer Betty Ehrenborg, in 1841.

Bring enrolled at Uppsala University in 1829 and at Lund University in 1832, where he obtained a master's degree in philosophy in 1835. Bring was appointed docent in dogmatic theology and moral theology in 1837 and ordained the same year. In 1844 he was appointed adjunct theology professor and in the same year provost of his own parishes. From 1839 to 1847 he held various professorships in the Faculty of Theology almost continuously, and in 1848 he was appointed professor of pastoral theology and in 1856 also dean of Lund Cathedral. In 1861 he was appointed bishop of Linköping; in 1860 he received his doctorate in theology, and in 1870 he was elevated to the second rank on the proposal of archbishop. He had an interest in public education and higher education and was a member of Pro Fide et Christianismo, a Christian education society.

As a councillor for the Diocese of Lund, he was a member of the clergy in the 1853 and 1856 Riksdag of the Estates, where he was a member in his own right in 1862–1863 and 1865–1866. During the first of these assemblies he was a member of the clergy's individual committee (pastoral department), during the second and third of the Committee on Civil Law and during the fourth of the Committee on the Constitution.

Bring was also a member of several committees: for the preparation of proposals for new sermon texts (1850), for the revision of the agenda and catechism (1852), as well as for the preparation of a new catechism (1869 and 1875). He also supported the revision of the 1819 hymnal. Oscar II's three eldest sons were prepared by him for their first Communion. As bishop, he held clerical meetings in 1862, 1868, 1874 and 1882.

Bring was one of the most prominent defenders of the high church movement in Sweden. In political matters as well, he remained on the conservative side. These journals feature several of his contributions. (See also Gottfrid Billing's "" (1886).)

Bring died in Linköping in 1884 and is buried at Norra griftegården.

References 

1814 births
1884 deaths
Rectors of Lund University
Lutheran theologians
Lutheran bishops of Linköping
19th-century Lutheran bishops
Pietists
Members of the Riksdag of the Estates